Spring Valley, California may refer to:

Spring Valley, San Diego County, California, census-designated place
Spring Valley, Butte County, California, former mining camp
Spring Valley, Colusa County, California, former settlement
Spring Valley, El Dorado County, California, unincorporated community
Spring Valley, Lake County, California, census-designated place
Valley Springs, California, in Calaveras County, formerly called Spring Valley